Kolyan Edgar Rudikovich (January 9, 1986 Artashat (Armenian SSR)) is an Armenian martial artist. His main focus is Kūdō and has had a prestigious history in Kudo competition. He has won various Kudo championships, namely has been a two-time world champion of kūdō in years 2005 and 2009.  He also won the World Cup in kūdō (2011).

He participated in and won various tournaments in the Amateur Pankration and MMA.  In all international tournaments since 2005 he has represented Russia.  Prior to this, including the World Championships Kudo 2005, he represented Armenia.

He is a Honored Master of Sports of Russia in Kudo and Candidate for Master of Sports of Russia in Army hand-to-hand combat, Candidate for Master of Sports of Russia in Combat Sambo.

References

External links
 Приказ от 05 сентября 2011 г. № 116-нг «О присвоении почетного спортивного звания „Заслуженный мастер спорта России“»
 Список награждаемых знаком Мастер боевых искусств 16 мая 2008 г.
 Лауреаты Национальной премии «Золотой пояс» 
 Колян Эдгар Рудикович
 Ивановский мастер кудо выиграл кубок мира
 Эдгар Колян

1986 births
Russian martial artists
Living people
Kūdō practitioners